Jean-Sébastien Vialatte (born 30 January 1951) is a French politician and Mayor of Six-Fours-les-Plages. From 2002 to 2017 he was a member of the National Assembly of France, where he represented the Var department.  Vialatte is a member of the Les Republicains.

References

1951 births
Living people
Union for a Popular Movement politicians
Deputies of the 12th National Assembly of the French Fifth Republic
Deputies of the 13th National Assembly of the French Fifth Republic
Deputies of the 14th National Assembly of the French Fifth Republic